China plans to launch eleven Huanjing satellites for disaster and environmental monitoring ("huanjing" is Chinese for "environment"). The satellites will be capable of visible, infrared, multi-spectral and synthetic-aperture radar imaging.

The first two satellites, Huanjing-1A and Huanjing-1B, were launched on 6 September 2008 on a Long March 2C rocket from the Taiyuan Satellite Launch Center. In a report dated 3 September 2008, the Associated Press of Pakistan indicated the launch would be conducted 5 September 2008 using a Long March 2C launch vehicle. On 5 September 2008, Aviation Week reported the first launch would be of optical imaging satellites.

Huanjing-1C was launched on 16 November 2012 on a Long March 2C rocket from the Taiyuan Satellite Launch Center. It is the first civilian Chinese remote sensing satellite to use a synthetic-aperture radar as imaging instrument. This S-band synthetic-aperture radar (SAR) was manufactured in Russia by NPO Mashinostroyeniya.

The two satellites, Huanjing-2A and Huanjing-2B, were launched on 27 September 2020 at 03:23 UTC on a Long March 4B launch vehicle from the Taiyuan Satellite Launch Center. The satellites "provide services concerning environmental protection, natural resources, water conservancy, agriculture and forestry", Xinhua said.

Launches

References 

Satellites orbiting Earth
Satellites of China
Space synthetic aperture radar
Spacecraft launched by Long March rockets